Bare Knuckle Pickups (Bare Knuckle, or BKP) is a privately-owned business based in the South West of England, UK, specialising in hand-wound electric guitar pickups. The pickups are wound and made entirely by hand from high quality parts which are made in-house, and come with a lifetime warranty. The company was founded in 2003 by Tim Mills, who had previously worked with Elkie Brooks and Iced Earth.

Pickups 
Bare Knuckle produce a complete range of humbuckers, single coils and bass pickups pickups ranging from original vintage models through to contemporary pickups such as the award winning 'The Mule' humbucker, 'Nailbomb' humbucker, 'Mississippi Queen' humbucker-size P90 and 'Apache' single coils.

Awards 
 Gold award to 'The Mule' and 'Apache' 
 Guitarist Choice award to 'PG Blues Set' 
 Golden M award to the 'Nailbomb' 
 Best Buy to the 'Warpig'

Artists 
Artists who have used the company's products include Propagandhi, Johnny Marr, Matt Bellamy, Gary Moore, Claudio Sanchez, Jon Schaffer, Gabe Mangold, Rabea Massaad, Misha Mansoor, and Steve Stevens. Additionally, several artists have signature pickups customized by BNK, including Misha Mansoor of Periphery (band), Juggernaut & Ragnarok model; Steve Stevens of Billy Idol's band, Rebel Yell model; Josh Smith of Northlane, Impulse model; and Rabea Massaad of Toska and Dorje (band), the Silo model.

Bare Knuckle Pickups are also fitted by guitar manufacturers, such as Fender Custom Shop, Ibanez Guitars, Manson Guitars, Blackmachine, and Peerless guitars.

References 

Guitar pickup manufacturers
Musical instrument parts and accessories